The Spalding Masters was a golf tournament held in New Zealand from 1968 to 1972. The event was generally hosted by Tauranga Golf Club in Tauranga, although the 1968 event was held at the nearby Mount Manganui Golf Club. The tournament was held in early January, although the 1972 event started on 30 December 1971.

History 
The tournament was part of the PGA of New Zealand circuit. Bob Charles won the event twice. His 1969 total of 260 tied Kel Nagle for the lowest 72-hole score ever in a tournament played outside of the United States.

Winners

1Held over 54 holes

2Reduced to 54 holes by bad weather

References

Golf tournaments in New Zealand
Recurring sporting events established in 1968
Recurring events disestablished in 1972
1968 establishments in New Zealand
1972 disestablishments in New Zealand